Richard Kent (born 12 September 1950) is a South African cricketer. He played in 33 first-class and 9 List A matches for Border from 1974/75 to 1982/83.

See also
 List of Border representative cricketers

References

External links
 

1950 births
Living people
South African cricketers
Border cricketers
People from Kokstad